Riley Parsons (born 5 May 2000) is an English former professional snooker player.

Career
As an amateur Parsons represented England at the 2018 EBSA European men's championship in Sofia Bulgaria.

Parsons turned professional for the first time in 2019 after progressing from Q School Event Two in Wigan.

The Englishman, who hails from Cannock, defeated Alexander Ursenbacher, Daniel Womersley, Chae Ross, Callum Lloyd and finally Peter Lines to earn a two-year tour card from the start of the 2019/20 World Snooker Tour.

He was not able to win a match his whole first season on tour. However, Parsons did win his opening match for the 2020–21 season, with a 5–4 win over Soheil Vahedi at the 2020 European Masters.

Parsons was relegated from the tour at the end of the 2020-21 season.

Personal life
Parsons was born in Cannock, Staffordshire.

Parsons has a daughter called Ivy-Mae, who was born in 2021, with his long-term girlfriend Amelia.

Performance and rankings timeline

References

External links
Riley Parsons at worldsnooker.com

English snooker players
Living people
2000 births
Sportspeople from Staffordshire
People from Cannock